Arthur James Kickham O'Connor (18 May 1888 – 10 May 1950) was an Irish politician, lawyer and judge.

Early life
He was born in 1888, the second son of Arthur O'Connor of Elm Hall, Celbridge, County Kildare (1834–1907) and his second wife Elizabeth (née Saul). He was educated at Blackrock College, County Dublin. He obtained the dispensation which was at that time required by Catholics in order to study engineering at the then almost exclusively Protestant Trinity College Dublin, from which he duly graduated in 1911.

Politics
O'Connor was elected Sinn Féin MP for Kildare South at the 1918 general election. In January 1919 Sinn Féin MPs, who had been elected in the Westminster elections of 1918, refused to recognise the Parliament of the United Kingdom and instead assembled as a unicameral revolutionary parliament called Dáil Éireann.  In the 1st Dáil, he was appointed Substitute Director of Agriculture during the absence of Robert Barton. In the 2nd Dáil he held the position of Minister of Agriculture from 26 August 1921 to 9 January 1922. O'Connor subsequently opposed the Anglo-Irish Treaty and joined the Republican side. In March 1926, O'Connor became titular President of the Republic when Éamon de Valera resigned. He later resigned the presidency in 1927. He lost his Dáil seat in the 1923 general election and failed to be elected again in 1927.

Later life
He retired from politics, returned to Trinity College Dublin to study law, after graduating in law he was called to the bar, subsequently appointed as Senior counsel, eventually being appointed Circuit Judge for Cork city.

He never married and died suddenly at his family home, Elm Hall, in 1950, and is buried in Donacomper Cemetery, Celbridge. His brothers were also involved in the Irish Republican movement and his sister Fanny was a member of Cumann na mBan. His brother Daniel was the State Solicitor for Kildare.

References

External links
 

 

1888 births
1950 deaths
Early Sinn Féin TDs
Members of the 1st Dáil
Members of the 2nd Dáil
Irish barristers
UK MPs 1918–1922
Members of the Parliament of the United Kingdom for County Kildare constituencies (1801–1922)
Politicians from County Kildare
People educated at Blackrock College
Ministers for Agriculture (Ireland)
Politicians imprisoned during the Irish revolutionary period
Circuit Court (Ireland) judges